Fittonia gigantea is a species of flowering plant in the family Acanthaceae, native to tropical rainforest in South America, mainly Peru.

Characteristics 

The perennials reach heights of 60 to 80 centimetres. Fittonia gigantea is evergreen. The simple leaves are opposite. They are ovate, entire and petiolate. Fittonia gigantea produces spikes of white labiate flowers, and later loculicidal capsules.

References 

Acanthaceae
House plants
Flora of Peru
Ornamental plants
Low light plants